Agrotera is a genus of snout moths in the subfamily Spilomelinae of the family Crambidae. It is the type genus of the tribe Agroterini and currently comprises 28 species distributed in the Afrotropical, Palearctic, Indomalayan and Australasian realm.

The caterpillars of Agrotera species feed on a variety of plants in the families Anacardiaceae, Betulaceae, Dipterocarpaceae, Fagaceae, Lythraceae, Melastomataceae, Myrtaceae and Rubiaceae.

The genera Leucinodella, Nistra, Sagariphora and Tetracona have been treated as synonyms of Agrotera in the past, but a recent taxonomic revision found them to be valid genera.

Species
Agrotera aculeata Liu, Qi & Wang, 2020, from Hainan
Agrotera albalis Maes, 2003, from Príncipe
Agrotera atalis Viette, 1958, from Madagascar
Agrotera barcealis (Walker, 1859) (syn. Leucinodes opalina Moore, 1885; syn. Zanclopteryx nitida Walker, 1866; syn. Zebronia indecisalis Walker, 1866; syn. Zebronia retractalis Walker, 1866), from Sri Lanka, Borneo and West Papua
Agrotera basinotata Hampson, 1891, from Tamil Nadu
Agrotera citrina Hampson, 1899, from Ghana
Agrotera dentata Liu, Qi & Wang, 2020, from Hainan
Agrotera discinotata Swinhoe, 1894, from Meghalaya
Agrotera effertalis (Walker, 1859), from Sri Lanka
Agrotera endoxantha Hampson, 1899, from New Guinea
Agrotera flavobasalis Inoue, 1996, from Bonin Islands
Agrotera fumosa Hampson, 1899, from Ghana
Agrotera genuflexa Chen, Horak, Du & Zhang, 2017, from Queensland
Agrotera glycyphanes Turner, 1913, from Northern Australia
Agrotera ignepicta Hampson, 1899, from Queensland
Agrotera ignepictoides Rothschild, 1916, from Papua
Agrotera lienpingialis Caradja, 1925, from China
Agrotera longitabulata Chen, Horak, Du & Zhang, 2017, from Queensland
Agrotera mysolalis (Walker, 1866), from West Papua
Agrotera namorokalis Marion & Viette, 1956, from Madagascar
Agrotera nemoralis (Scopoli, 1763) (syn. Agrotera posticalis Wileman, 1911; syn. Phalaena erosalis Fabricius, 1794), from Eurasia
Agrotera ornata Wileman & South, 1917, from Taiwan
Agrotera protensa Liu, Qi & Wang, 2020, from Hainan
Agrotera robustispina Lu, Qi & Wang, 2020, from Hainan
Agrotera rufitinctalis Hampson, 1917, from Malawi
Agrotera scissalis (Walker, 1866), from Java
Agrotera semipictalis Kenrick, 1907, from Papua New Guinea
Agrotera setipes Hampson, 1899, from the Natuna Islands

Former species 
Agrotera amathealis (Walker, 1859) (syn. Pyralis ornatalis Walker, 1866), type species of the genus Tetracona Meyrick, 1884
Agrotera coelatalis (Walker, 1859) (syn. Botys proximalis Walker, 1866), type species of the genus Nistra Walker, 1859
Agrotera leucostola Hampson, 1896 (syn. Leucinodella agroterodes Strand, 1918), now in the genus Leucinodella Walker, 1859
Agrotera magnificalis Hampson, 1893 (syn. Cataclysta helopalis Clemens, 1860; syn. Sagariphora heliochlaena Meyrick, 1894), now in the genus Sagariphora Meyrick, 1894
Agrotera pictalis (Warren, 1896), now in the genus Tetracona Meyrick, 1884

References

Spilomelinae
Crambidae genera
Taxa named by Franz von Paula Schrank